King Animal is the sixth and final studio album by American rock band Soundgarden—their first in sixteen years. Produced by both the band and Adam Kasper, it was released on November 13, 2012, by Seven Four Entertainment and Republic Records in the United States, and by Vertigo Records in the rest of the world. It was the first of Soundgarden's albums not to be released on A&M Records since 1988's Ultramega OK, though Republic, Vertigo, and A&M are all owned by Universal Music Group. The album was the final studio album released by Soundgarden before the death of frontman Chris Cornell in 2017 and the subsequent dissolution of the band in 2018.

Background and recording
In January 2010, Chris Cornell announced that, 13 years after their break-up, Soundgarden had reunited. At first, the band was primarily interested in relearning their old songs and playing them live, but Cornell declared that "It would be exciting to record one song, to hear how Soundgarden-ish that might be this much time later." The band's first studio work was finishing the song "Black Rain" for the compilation Telephantasm (2010), which guitarist Kim Thayil said "showed our evolvement creatively", and in late 2010  drummer Matt Cameron booked studio time to show some song ideas and have the band compose some more through jam sessions. In February 2011, it was announced on Soundgarden's homepage that they had started writing new songs. One month later, recording sessions for a new album began at Seattle's Studio X, with producer Adam Kasper. The sessions were interrupted by the end of the month so Cornell could move onto his solo "Songbook" tour, which would be interspersed with Soundgarden concerts. As the band's contract with A&M Records was fulfilled after releasing Telephantasm and the live album Live on I-5 (2011), Soundgarden produced King Animal independently.

Cameron claimed in April 2011 that the album would be released later that year, but the recording was prolonged, with Thayil saying: "the more we enjoy it, the more our fans should end up enjoying it." In October, Cornell said the band would return to the studio in December and the album was "mostly done, we just need to finish a couple of songs and mix it, so that will be happening probably over the holidays."

In May 2012, the band reported they were eyeing a release that October. On September 17, it was announced that the album would be titled King Animal and would be released on November 13, 2012. Cornell said the title relates to how the band "were a big fish in a small pond, and we sort of graduated. There was a sense of us feeling like it was us four against the world. We clearly had that from the very beginning. In some weird way after all this time, we persevered. The album kind of stands out as a symbol and an indication of that."

Composition and style
The band reported that they had 12 to 14 songs that were "kind of ready to go" in March 2011, and the material for the album was "90 percent new". One of the songs that is an updated version of an older idea is "Taree", which bassist Ben Shepherd wrote in the late 1990s. He had recorded a demo of the song for his solo album In Deep Owl (2013) before the band's reunion, but then decided it deserved a full-band treatment.

In June 2011, Thayil said some songs on the album would sound "similar in a sense to Down on the Upside", and the album "pick[s] up where we left off. There are some heavy moments, and there are some fast songs", though the maturation of the musicians during the band's hiatus has also been said to be evident. "Non-State Actor" is mostly in 4/4, but has parts in 5/8 and 7/8. "By Crooked Steps" in 5/4.

Artwork
The album's cover and subsequent art direction is based on a sculpture titled "Night of the Last Equinox" by Josh Graham, who Thayil sought out after seeing the artwork Graham had done for his band A Storm of Light. Featuring animal skulls above a field of flowers in a snowy forest, the sculpture features a recurring motif of Graham's art: the juxtaposition of life and death and how "everything between there is such a massive part of the human condition." Cornell said the art was inspired by Graham's interpretation of the songs, and he felt it was a good fit, given the band's frequent moody lyrics with an outdoor theme. Thayil revealed that the band asked for art that featured white and other lighter colors, as "most of our album covers have had a darker pallet". Graham also did the animated backdrops that Soundgarden used during the album's tour and directed the music video for the album's first single, "Been Away Too Long". The pictures of the band members in the booklet that accompanied the album were taken by the band manager Don VanCleave.

Promotion and release
For the release of King Animal, Soundgarden signed a deal with longtime label executive Tom Whalley's new Loma Vista Recordings, and distribution was handled by Loma Vista's partner Republic Records. Cornell said the experience of only seeking a label once the album was completed was "almost like it was in the beginning of the band." To promote the album, the band recorded a track-by-track narrative at Seattle's Moore Theatre and performed intimate concerts at New York's Irving Plaza, Toronto's Phoenix Concert Theatre, and Los Angeles' Fonda Theatre.

"Been Away Too Long" was released on September 27, 2012, almost seven weeks before the album. Both it and "By Crooked Steps" were used in promotional spots on ESPN for Monday Night Football, and "Been Away Too Long" was used in an episode of Sons of Anarchy. On October 31, 2012, a video for "Non-State Actor" was posted on the official Soundgarden YouTube channel, the visuals consisting of a waving American flag with the King Animal logo in place of the stars. The week before its November 13 release, the whole album could be streamed for free on iTunes. Dave Grohl directed a music video for "By Crooked Steps", which was released on January 29, 2013, and a music video for "Halfway There" was released on September 4.

Versions
Along with standard CD, double LP, and digital download releases, King Animal was also issued as a deluxe box set that featured the CD with three demos as bonus tracks, the double LP, a DVD of the band's 2012 performance at Hyde Park, and five lithographs. There were several different versions of the CD release, in the United States and internationally, that included various demos as bonus tracks, and for Record Store Day 2013 Soundgarden issued King Animal Demos, a limited edition pink vinyl that collected all six of those demos on a single release. Later in 2013, King Animal Plus was released, which featured five live tracks recorded for Live from the Artists Den at The Wiltern in Los Angeles and an acoustic version of "Halfway There" that Cornell and Shepherd recorded for CIMX-FM in Detroit.

Critical reception

On Metacritic, the album has a normalized score of 70 out of 100 based on reviews from 32 critics, which indicates it received "generally favorable reviews".

Stephen Thomas Erlewine of AllMusic gave the album a positive review, writing: "King Animal is a big, bright album, executed with precision and professionalism. The band members sound more elderly, not quite as loud, and possess a keener sense of good taste, and it sounds as if they've aged together, which is a testament to their innate chemistry. Simply put, Soundgarden sound like they belong together; Cornell sounds richer, fuller when anchored by drummer Matt Cameron, bassist Ben Shepherd, and the deceptively sinewy and brainy guitarist Kim Thayil, whose presence has sorely been missed over the past decade." Luke Turner of BBC Music was also positive, saying: "King Animal undeniably draws its strength from the band's accessible Superunknown era, but also takes Soundgarden somewhere fresh." Richard Trapunski of Now gave the album four out of five stars and wrote: "King Animal doesn’t sound like a nostalgia-fed cash grab, nor is it poisoned by the desperate commercialism of Cornell's post-Soundgarden projects. Instead, it picks up where 1996's Down on the Upside left off, layering Cornell's distinct howl over psychedelic textures, off-kilter time signatures and heavy, chugging riffs courtesy of way-underrated guitarist Kim Thayil."

Chris DeVille of The A.V. Club gave the album a B− and said: "More often, though, King Animal affirms what a potent formula this band established. It's neither a trainwreck nor a masterpiece, but it stirs the senses in all the right ways." Michael Christopher of The Phoenix gave the album three out of four stars and wrote: "On the whole, King Animal is a welcome return, and though it doesn't reinvent the wheel, it reminds us why these guys were considered the architects of the Seattle scene." Tim Karan of the Alternative Press gave the album three and a half out of five stars and said: "It's difficult to imagine a new Soundgarden album that would sound startlingly different from King Animal. It's right in line with the band's natural progression; so much so that it's almost difficult to believe it didn’t come out a decade ago. Is it as evocative and emotive as their earlier albums? Not quite. But it's new Soundgarden songs that sound like old Soundgarden songs—and if you’re of a certain generation or disposition, that's been a long time coming." Hilary Saunders of Paste gave the album a 7.0 out of 10 and wrote: "Comeback albums are notoriously difficult to conceptualize and actualize and King Animal took more than a year to create after the band spent a decade and a half on hiatus. While this record lacks the canonizing tracks like 'Jesus Christ Pose', 'Black Hole Sun', 'Spoonman' and 'Burden in My Hand', Soundgarden deserves to be commended for recapturing the feeling of grunge and reintroducing it today." Matt Melis of Consequence of Sound gave the album a C− and said: "Production issues aside, this record proves that Soundgarden still have their muscle but also hints that they are in the process of figuring out how to flex it again. For every realized track like 'Worse Dreams', with its circular vocal phrasings and slippery riffing, there's a jam like 'Eyelid's Mouth' that completely loses its identity — in this case, via an almost painful chorus that asks, 'Who let the river run dry?' Still, there's more than enough merit found in King Animal to ensure that any future tweets by Chris Cornell about new Soundgarden music will confidently be filed under #reallygoodnews."

Scott McLennan of The Boston Globe gave the album a mixed review, writing: "There's nothing bad about these 13 tracks, but nothing truly remarkable either. It's been 16 years since singer Chris Cornell, guitarist Kim Thayil, bassist Ben Shepherd, and drummer Matt Cameron applied their combined talents to new songs, and while the old chemistry sounds intact (though can we get more from the drummer, please?) the material is not particularly combustible." Jonathan Keefe of Slant Magazine gave the album three out of five stars and said: "King Animal doesn't contain any standout tracks that justify Soundgarden's comeback or which rank as essential additions to the band's very strong catalogue. The album is less a triumphant return than an example of what happens to most middle-aged rock bands: They've returned as a slightly more conservative version of what made them famous in the first place." Stuart Berman of Pitchfork Media gave the album a 5.9 out of 10 and wrote: "The best hope for King Animal was that Soundgarden would be inspired enough by their spiritual successors to want to outdo them, and set a new benchmark for ambitious aggression. Instead, the group's first album since 1996 just sounds like the one they would've churned out in 1998."

Commercial performance
In the United States, the album debuted at number 5 on the Billboard 200 chart after selling 83,000 copies during its first week of release. This was the third highest position Soundgarden had achieved on the chart, behind Superunknown (1994), which had reached number 1, and Down on the Upside (1996), which had reached number 2.  As of November 2016, King Animal has sold 235,000 copies in the U.S.

Internationally, the album reached the top five of the New Zealand and Danish album charts; the top ten of the Canadian, Australian, Swiss, German, and Finnish charts; the top twenty of the Norwegian, Irish, Italian, and Austrian charts; and the top thirty of the British, Spanish, Dutch, Scottish, and Swedish charts.

Track listing

Personnel

Soundgarden
 Chris Cornell – vocals, guitar; piano (6), mandolin (7), producer, additional recording
 Kim Thayil – lead guitar; mandolin (4), horn arrangements (4, 9), producer
 Ben Shepherd – bass guitar; additional guitar (7, 8), baritone guitar (8), backing vocals (8), producer
 Matt Cameron – drums, percussion; Moog synthesizer (5 and 12), backing vocals (8), producer

Additional musicians
Adam Kasper – piano (6), tambura (4), producer
Jeff McGrath – trumpet (4 and 9)
Greg Powers – tenor and bass trombones (4 and 9)
Brad Stevens – tenor and baritone saxophones (9)
Bubba Dupree – stun guitar (8)
Bullet – additional vocals (9)
Mike McCready – additional guitar (12)

Technical personnel

Joe Barresi – mixing, additional production
Nate Yaccino – engineer
Sam Hofstedt – engineer
Josh Evans – engineer, studio assistant
Jay Follette – studio assistant
Neil Hundt – studio assistant
Gregg Keplinger – studio assistant
Jun Murakawa – mixing assistant
Ted Jensen – mastering
Josh Graham – album cover sculpture (The Last Equinox), album cover photography and design
Don Vancleave – band photography

Charts

Weekly charts

Year-end charts

See also
 King Animal Demos

References

2012 albums
Albums produced by Adam Kasper
Soundgarden albums
Universal Republic Records albums
Vertigo Records albums
Psychedelic rock albums by American artists